Charles Wesley (18 December 1707 – 29 March 1788) was an English leader of the Methodist movement. Wesley was a prolific hymnwriter who wrote over 6,500 hymns during his lifetime. His works include "And Can It Be", "Christ the Lord Is Risen Today", the carol "Hark! The Herald Angels Sing", and "Lo! He Comes With Clouds Descending".

Charles Wesley was born in Epworth, Lincolnshire, the son of Anglican cleric and poet Samuel Wesley and his wife Susanna. He was a younger brother of Methodist founder John Wesley and Anglican cleric Samuel Wesley the Younger, and he became the father of musician Samuel Wesley and grandfather of musician Samuel Sebastian Wesley.

He was educated at Oxford University, where his brothers had also studied, and he formed the "Holy Club" among his fellow students in 1729. John Wesley later joined this group, as did George Whitefield. Charles followed his father and brother into the church in 1735, and he travelled with John to Georgia in America, returning a year later. Following their evangelical conversions in 1738, the Wesley brothers travelled throughout Britain, converting followers to the Methodist revival through preaching and hymn-singing. In 1749, he married Sarah Gwynne, daughter of a Welsh gentleman who had been converted to Methodism by Howell Harris. From 1756 his ministry became more static and he ministered in Bristol, and later London.

Despite their closeness, Charles and John did not always agree on questions relating to their beliefs. In particular, Charles was strongly opposed to the idea of a breach with the Church of England into which they had been ordained.

Biography

Early life
Charles Wesley was the eighteenth child of Susanna Wesley and Samuel Wesley. He was born in Epworth, Lincolnshire, England, where his father was rector. In 1716, at the age of 8, he entered Westminster School, where his brother Samuel was usher. He was selected as King's Scholar in 1721 and head boy in 1725–26, before matriculating at Christ Church, Oxford.

At Oxford, Charles formed a prayer group among his fellow students in 1727; his elder brother, John, joined in 1729, soon becoming its leader and moulding it in line with his own convictions. They focused on studying the Bible and living a holy life. Other students mocked them, saying they were the "Holy Club", "Sacramentarians", and "the Methodists", being methodical and exceptionally detailed in their Bible study, opinions and disciplined lifestyle. The Wesleys' future colleague, George Whitefield joined the group. Charles tutored while studying; he graduated in 1732 with a master's degree in classical languages and literature. Charles followed his father and brothers into Anglican orders, being ordained as a priest in September 1735. That same year his father died.

Voyage to America
On 14 October 1735, Charles and his brother John sailed on The Simmonds from Gravesend, Kent for Savannah in Georgia Colony in British America at the request of the governor, James Oglethorpe. Charles was appointed Secretary of Indian Affairs and while John remained in Savannah, Charles went as chaplain to the garrison and colony at nearby Fort Frederica, St. Simon's Island, arriving there Tuesday, 9 March 1736 according to his journal entry. Matters did not turn out well, and he was largely rejected by the settlers. In July 1736, Charles was commissioned to England as the bearer of dispatches to the trustees of the colony. On 16 August 1736, he sailed from Charleston, South Carolina, never to return to the Georgia colony.

Ministry
In 1738 the Wesley brothers had religious experiences: Charles experienced a conversion on 21 May, and John had a similar experience in Aldersgate Street just three days later. A City of London blue plaque at 13 Little Britain, near the church of St Botolph, Aldersgate, off St. Martin's Le Grand, marks the site of the former house of John Bray, reputed to be the scene of Charles' evangelical conversion. It reads, "Adjoining this site stood the house of John Bray. Scene of Charles Wesley's evangelical conversion, May 21st 1738".

Charles felt renewed strength to spread the gospel to ordinary people and it was around then that he began to write the poetic hymns for which he would become known. In January 1739, he was appointed as curate to serve at St Mary's Church, Islington, but was forced to resign when the churchwardens objected to his evangelical preaching. Later that same year, finding that they were unwelcome inside parish churches, the Wesley brothers took to preaching to crowds in open fields. They were influenced by George Whitefield, whose open-air preaching was already reaching great numbers of Bristol colliers. From 1740, John and Charles were the joint leaders of the Methodist Revival and evangelised throughout Britain and Ireland. They were opposed by many Anglican clergy, especially when their appointed lay preachers began to preach in parishes without seeking permission. In Newcastle Charles established its first Methodist society in September 1742, and he faced mob violence at Wednesbury and Sheffield in 1743 and at Devizes in 1747.

Following a period of illness, after 1756 Charles made no more journeys to distant parts of the country, mainly just moving between Bristol and London. Increasingly in his later years Charles became the mouthpiece of the so-called 'Church Methodists'—he was strongly opposed to a separation of Methodism from its Anglican roots. In the 1780s, he was especially dismayed by his brother's ordination of priests to serve in America (see ), which he criticised in a published poem.

Marriage and children

In April 1749, he married the much younger Sarah Gwynne (1726–1822), also known as Sally. She was the daughter of Marmaduke Gwynne, a wealthy Welsh magistrate who had been converted to Methodism by Howell Harris. They moved into a house at 4 Charles Street in Bristol in September 1749. Sarah accompanied the brothers on their journeys throughout Britain, until at least 1753.

In 1771, Charles obtained another house, in London, and moved into it that year with his elder son. By 1778 the whole family had transferred from Bristol to the London house, at 1 Great Chesterfield Street (now Wheatley Street), Marylebone, where they remained until Charles' death and on into the 19th century. The house in Bristol still stands and has been restored, however the London house was demolished in the mid 19th century.

Only three of the couple's children survived infancy: Charles Wesley junior (1757–1834), Sarah Wesley (1759–1828), who like her mother was also known as Sally, and Samuel Wesley (1766–1837). Their other children, John, Martha Maria, Susannah, Selina and John James are all buried in Bristol, having died between 1753 and 1768. (See monument in garden on north side of junction of Lewis Mead and The Haymarket, Bristol.) Both Samuel and Charles junior were musical child prodigies and, like their father, became organists and composers. Charles junior spent most of his career as the personal organist of the Royal Family, and Samuel became one of the most accomplished musicians in the world and is often called "the English Mozart". Samuel Wesley's son, Samuel Sebastian Wesley, was one of the foremost British composers of the 19th century.

Death and burial

On his deathbed he sent for the Rector of St Marylebone Parish Church, John Harley, and purportedly told him "Sir, whatever the world may say of me, I have lived, and I die, a member of the Church of England. I pray you to bury me in your churchyard." At the age of 80, he died on 29 March 1788, in London. His body was carried to the church by six clergymen of the Church of England. A memorial stone to him stands in the gardens in Marylebone High Street, close to his place of burial. One of his sons, Samuel, became the organist at the church.

Hymns and other works

Charles Wesley was a prolific hymnwriter. Among the collections (hymnals) of Wesley's hymns published in his lifetime were Hymns on God's Everlasting Love (1741, 1742), Hymns on the Lord's Supper (1745), and Short Hymns on Select Passages of the Holy Scriptures (1762), together with others celebrating the major festivals of the Christian year. His hymns are marked by their strong doctrinal content (notably the Arminian insistence on the universality of God's love), a richness of scriptural and literary allusion, and the variety of his metrical and stanza forms. They are considered to have had a significant influence not only on Methodism, but on Christian worship and modern theology as a whole.

Wesley's poetry included epistles, elegies and political and satirical verse. A collected edition of The Poetical Works of John and Charles Wesley, edited by George Osborn, was published in thirteen volumes in 1868–1872. Osborn's collection has now been supplemented by the three volumes of The Unpublished Poetry of Charles Wesley.

Jason E. Vickers states that Wesley's 'conversion experience' in 1738 had a clear impact on his doctrine, especially doctrine concerning the power of the Holy Spirit. The change was most prominent in his hymns written after the same year. From his published work Hymns and Prayers to the Trinity and in Hymn number 62 he writes "The Holy Ghost in part we know, For with us He resides, Our whole of good to Him we owe, Whom by His grace he guides, He doth our virtuous thoughts inspire, The evil he averts, And every seed of good desire, He planted in our hearts." Charles communicates several doctrines: the personal indwelling of the Holy Spirit, the sanctifying work of the Spirit, the depravity of mankind, and humanity's personal accountability to God.

Hymnody
In the course of his career, Wesley published the words of between 6,500 and 10,000 hymns, many of which are still popular. These include:
"Arise, My Soul, Arise" (Words)
"And Can It Be That I Should Gain?" (Words)
"Christ the Lord Is Risen Today" (Words)
"Christ, Whose Glory Fills the Skies" (Words)
"Come, O Thou Traveler Unknown" (Words)
"Come, Thou Long Expected Jesus" (Words)
"Depth of Mercy, Can it Be" (Words)
"Father, I Stretch My Hands to Thee" (Words)
"Hail the Day That Sees Him Rise" (Words)
"Hark! The Herald Angels Sing" (Words)
"Jesus, Lover of My Soul" (Words)
"Jesus, The Name High Over All" (Words)
"Lo! He Comes with Clouds Descending" (Words)
"Love Divine, All Loves Excelling" (Words)
"O for a Heart to Praise My God" (Words)
"O for a Thousand Tongues to Sing" (Words)
"O Thou Who Camest from Above" (Words)
"Rejoice, the Lord is King" (Words)
"Soldiers of Christ, Arise" (Words)
"Sun of Unclouded Righteousness" (Words)
"Thou Hidden Source of Calm Repose" (Words)
"Ye Servants of God" (Words)

The words to many more of Charles Wesley's hymns can be found on Wikisource, and in his many publications.

Some 150 of his hymns are in the Methodist hymn book Hymns and Psalms, including "Hark! the Herald Angels Sing", and The Church Hymn Book (In New York and Chicago, US, 1872) where "Jesus, Lover of My Soul" is published. Many of his hymns are translated into other languages, and form the foundation for Methodist hymnals, as well as the Swedish Metodist-Episkopal-Kyrkans Psalmbok printed in Stockholm in 1892.

Psalms 
Wesley's hymns are notable as interpretations of Scripture. He also produced paraphrases of the Psalms, contributing to the long tradition of English metrical Psalmody. A notable feature of his Psalms is the introduction of Jesus into the Psalms, continuing a tradition of Christological readings of the Psalms evident in the translations of John Patrick and Isaac Watts. The introduction of Jesus into the Psalms was often the source of controversy, even within Wesley's own family. Charles' brother Samuel Wesley wrote a poem against such practice. Of particular importance is Wesley's manuscript Psalms, held in the archives of the Pitts Theology Library at Emory University.

Legacy

Wesley is still remembered for his ministry while in St. Simon's Island, Georgia, by the South Georgia Conference of the United Methodist Church; in 1950, the conference opened a Christian retreat center on the island by the banks of the Frederica River, designating it Epworth by the Sea in honour of his and John's birthplace.

He is commemorated in the Calendar of Saints of the Evangelical Lutheran Church in America on 2 March with his brother John. The Wesley brothers are also commemorated on 3 March in the Calendar of Saints of the Episcopal Church. Charles is commemorated on 29 March in the Calendar of Commemorations by The Order of Saint Luke; John is commemorated on 2 March; their parents are also commemorated.

Charles is remembered (with John) in the Church of England with a Lesser Festival on 24 May.

As a result of his enduring hymnody, the Gospel Music Association recognised his musical contributions to the art of gospel music in 1995 by listing his name in the Gospel Music Hall of Fame.

Wesley's hymns are utilised in not only Methodist churches but other Protestant denominations, and have been adopted by the Roman Catholic Church. Wesley wrote two of the so-called Great Four Anglican Hymns: "Hark! The Herald Angels Sing" and "Lo! He Comes With Clouds Descending".

Memorials

Tercentenary
24 May 2007 was celebrated as the tercentenary of Wesley's birth, with many celebratory events held throughout England, even though Wesley was in fact born in December 1707. The date of 24 May is known to Methodists as Aldersgate Day and commemorates the spiritual awakening of first Charles and then John Wesley in 1738.

In November 2007, An Post, the Irish Post Office, issued a 78-cent stamp to commemorate the 300th anniversary of Wesley's birth.

In film
 A Heart Set Free – T. N. Mohan, 2007, a feature-length documentary on Charles Wesley's life and hymns.
 Wesley – Foundery Pictures, 2009, starring Burgess Jenkins as John Wesley, R. Keith Harris as Charles Wesley, and featuring June Lockhart as Susanna Wesley and Kevin McCarthy as Bishop Ryder

References

External links

Charles Wesley at the Eighteenth-Century Poetry Archive (ECPA)
Biography and works at the Cyber Hymnal
Biography and articles about Charles Wesley
The Journal of Charles Wesley
Papers of Charles Wesley
 
 
Charles Wesley family papers, 1740–1864 at Pitts Theology Library, Candler School of Theology
Charles Wesley Conference 2007 held at Liverpool Hope University
'Charles Wesley in Historical Perspective: Poet, Priest and Theologian', lecture delivered by Revd Professor Kenneth Newport, at Gresham College, 13 December 2007. (Available for download as MP3 and MP4).
Charles Wesley's Journal 1736–56 on A Vision of Britain through Time, with links to the places visited.
A Man Named Wesley Passed This Way historical marker at St. Simons Island, Georgia
Reverends John & Charles Wesley historical marker
Stuart A. Rose Manuscript, Archives, and Rare Book Library, Emory University: Charles Wesley family papers, 1740–1864

1707 births
1788 deaths
18th-century English Anglican priests
18th-century English Christian theologians
18th-century English musicians
18th-century English non-fiction writers
18th-century British composers
18th-century hymnwriters
Alumni of Christ Church, Oxford
English Anglican missionaries
British chaplains
Methodist missionaries in the United States
Church of England hymnwriters
English Methodist missionaries
English evangelicals
Evangelical Anglican theologians
Evangelists
People of Georgia (British colony)
People celebrated in the Lutheran liturgical calendar
English Methodist hymnwriters
Methodist theologians
Arminian ministers
Arminian writers
People educated at Westminster School, London
People from Epworth, Lincolnshire
Charles
Sacred music composers
Protestant missionaries in England
String quartet composers
Burials at St Marylebone Parish Church
Anglican saints
18th-century Anglican theologians